Parken Zoo is a combined amusement park and zoo in the town of Eskilstuna in Sweden.

The amusement park was founded in 1898, and there was a display of animals from the beginning of the fifties. In 1954 Parken Zoo started to charge visitors an entrance fee. In 1956 the zoo displayed around 200 animals.

During the eighties the zoo started to specialize in feline carnivores.

In 2013 a clouded leopard escaped from its enclosure and killed three deer.

The history of Parken zoo 
Parken zoo opened the third of July 1898. And during the 1950s the zoo became a part of Parken Zoo. The prize of an entry ticket was 50 öre which is half of a Swedish krona. The zoo grew a little each day and by the year 1956, the zoo had 200 animals of different species.

On the 24th of march the zoo was sold to the company Mimir Capital AB for the sum of one Swedish krona, although Eskilstuna county kept ownership of the territory.

External links

References
Much of the content of this article comes from the equivalent Swedish-language wikipedia article.  Retrieved on 6 December 2014. Some of the following references are cited by that Swedish-language article:

Zoos in Sweden
Tourist attractions in Södermanland County
Zoos established in 1954
1954 establishments in Sweden